Miloš Ostojić may refer to:
Miloš Ostojić (footballer, born 1991), Serbian association football defender
Miloš Ostojić (footballer, born 1996), Serbian association football goalkeeper